Evaporimetry is medical test to measure the rate of the evaporation of the eye. Individuals with meibomian gland dysfunction will have an increased rate of evaporation because the glands release lower quality (or lower quantity) meibum. This impacts the tear film increasing the evaporation rate and can cause dry eye. The device used to perform an evaporimetry is called evaporimeter.

See also 
 Meibomian gland
 Dry eye
 Blepharitis

References 

Eye procedures